Eduardo Rodríguez Fernández (born 8 June 1966) is a Spanish retired footballer who played as a striker.

He is Hércules league's all-time top scorer and played professionally for 13 years, in representation of five clubs.

Club career
Born in Sanlúcar de Barrameda, Cádiz, Andalusia, Rodríguez arrived at Real Betis at the age of 17. During his eight-year link with the club he would only appear in seven La Liga games – six coming in the 1988–89 season under the guidance of Eusebio Ríos, who was sacked after the 13th round – also being loaned twice, successively to Recreativo de Huelva and CD Badajoz, helping the latter win the Segunda División B championship, albeit without promotion.

Rodríguez signed for Hércules CF in the 1991 summer, being instrumental as the team returned to Segunda División in his second year, with 32 goals scored. After netting four times in as many games into 1993–94, he returned to the top level with Rayo Vallecano, signing for €300.000; he only managed to score once during the campaign, and the Madrid outskirts side suffered relegation.

After helping Rayo immediately regain its lost status, Rodríguez returned to Hércules and achieved the same feat, scoring 14 goals from 30 appearances as the Alicante team returned to the top flight. He only added one, however, one in the following season – in a 3–2 away win against FC Barcelona on 13 January 1997 – in an eventual relegation.

Rodríguez retired from football in June 1998 at the age of 32. After briefly working with main club Hércules in directorial capacities, he lost all connection to the football world, remaining in Alicante.

Honours

Club
Badajoz
Segunda División B: 1990–91

Hércules
Segunda División: 1995–96

Individual
Segunda División B: Top Scorer 1992–93

References

External links

1966 births
Living people
People from Sanlúcar de Barrameda
Sportspeople from the Province of Cádiz
Spanish footballers
Footballers from Andalusia
Association football forwards
La Liga players
Segunda División players
Segunda División B players
Tercera División players
Betis Deportivo Balompié footballers
Real Betis players
Recreativo de Huelva players
CD Badajoz players
Hércules CF players
Rayo Vallecano players